Bjartveit is a surname. Notable people with the name include:

 Eleonore Bjartveit (1924–2002), Norwegian politician, wife of Kjell
 Kjell Bjartveit (1927–2011), Norwegian physician and politician

Norwegian-language surnames